Cristia is a genus of snout moths. It was described by Whalley, in 1964. It contains the species C. sericeana which is known from New Guinea.

References

Moths described in 1964
Tirathabini
Monotypic moth genera
Moths of Oceania
Pyralidae genera